Torrens Act or Torrens ACT may refer to:

 Torrens title
 Torrens, Australian Capital Territory